The West Coast Eagles are an Australian rules football team based in Perth, Western Australia. The 2020 AFL Women's season was their first year in that competition. Luke Dwyer was the team's inaugural coach, and Emma Swanson was the team's inaugural captain. West Coast finished the home-and-away season seventh out of seven on the ladder, with a win–loss record of 1–5.

Dana Hooker was the team's best and fairest player, winning the West Coast Club Champion medal. Hayley Bullas was the team's leading goalkicker, with two goals.

Background

The West Coast Eagles are an Australian rules football team based in Perth, Western Australia. Having competed in the men's Australian Football League since 1987, 2020 was their first year in the AFL Women's competition.

Luke Dwyer was announced as the inaugural West Coast Eagles AFLW coach in December 2018. He was already a development coach for the Eagles' men's team.

The vice-captain was Dana Hooker, and the rest of the leadership group consisted of Maddy Collier, Courtney Guard and Alicia Janz.

West Coast had 3,318 members in 2020, the most of any AFLW club.

Impact of COVID-19

On 11 March 2020, COVID-19 was formally declared a pandemic. This was on the Wednesday prior to round 6. Due to their ladder position at the end of round 6, West Coast did not proceed to the finals series.

Playing list

Statistics

Season summary
West Coast were in Conference B for the 2020 AFLW season.

Results

Ladder

Awards

West Coast held its inaugural AFLW awards night at Mineral Resources Park on 11 August 2020. Vice-captain Dana Hooker won the Club Champion award with 26 votes. The runners-up were Emma Swanson, with 25 votes, and Ashlee Atkins and Parris Laurie with 23 votes. Imahra Cameron was the Best First Year Player, and Alicia Janz was the Best Club Person.

Dana Hooker was West Coast's only player in the 40-woman initial All-Australian squad. She did not get selected for the All-Australian team.

See also
 2020 West Coast Eagles season

References

West Coast Eagles seasons
2020 AFL Women's season